Antonín Šponar (8 April 1920 – November 2002) was a Czech alpine skier. He competed in three events at the 1948 Winter Olympics.

References

1920 births
2002 deaths
Czech male alpine skiers
Olympic alpine skiers of Czechoslovakia
Alpine skiers at the 1948 Winter Olympics
Sportspeople from Prague